The Leica M4 is a 35 mm rangefinder camera produced by Ernst Leitz GmbH.

Leica M4 
The M4 started production in November 1966, as the direct successor of the M3 and M2, featuring framelines for 35 mm, 50 mm, 90 mm and 135 mm lenses in a 0.72 magnification viewfinder. It has the frame counter of the M3, with automatic reset after reloading. The M4 was the last Leica rangefinder of this era to be predominantly hand-built. 

Three ergonomic modifications were introduced in the M4: 
 an articulating film advance lever, modernised self-timer and frame selection levers
 an angled crank for rewinding the film that replaced the slow to use telescopic knob of the M3
 a faster loading system that does not require use of a removable spool

Production of the Leica M4 ceased in 1975.

An olive coloured Leica M4, originally designed for the West German Army, sold at auction in 2009 for €87,600.

Leica MDa 
A scientific version without a viewfinder was made as the Leica MDa (similar to the Leica M1).

Leica M4-2, Leica M4-P 
Production of the M4 stopped briefly in 1972. Its successor, the M5 had been introduced in 1971. However, the relatively bulky and expensive M5 met with a cool reception, and sales did not live up to Leica's expectations. Production of the M4 was therefore restarted quickly until 1975. In the year 1975, a special edition was made for Leica's 50th Anniversary, and in 1977 the company launched the updated M4-2, which was based on the M4's body, but with a streamlined production process that reduced manufacturing cost. The M4-2 added a hot shoe and motor drive compatibility as standard, but removed the self-timer.

The M4-2 was followed in 1981 by the M4-P, which added framelines for 28 mm and 75 mm lenses. The range continued with the Leica M6 in 1984, which was essentially an M4-P with through-the-lens (TTL) light metering. The M4-P finally ceased production in 1986

References

External links 

M4
Leica rangefinder cameras

de:Leica M4